AKB48 Fes 2016 is the special event held by AKB48 and sister groups, recorded live at NHK Hall, in . The 3-hour special includes 41 songs and comedy skits, and features a live band in the last segment.

Three songs from Encore aired on regular episodes of AKB48 Show!. "Love Trip" was the opening performance from episode #120, and will be the final song for the special. The other two songs are "365 Nichi no Kamihikouki" & "To Be Continued", and will air on episode #130.

Segments

Special
 Opening performances from 48G
 Comedy Skit #1
 "Ōgoe Diamond/Koisuru Fortune Cookie"
 Solo Performances
 "Shonichi" 
 "Give Me Five!" 
 "Kareha no Station" 
 Comedy Skit #2
 NMB48 BAND Showcase
 "HA!"
 "Punkish"
 Comedy Skit #3
 Miki Nishino Dance Classroom ~Special Edition~
 Dance Showcase
 Special Units Showcase
 "Ame no Pianist"
 "Heart Gata Virus"
 "Candy"
 "Warukii" 
 "Kiseki wa ma ni Awanai"
 "Zannen Shoujo"
 "Itoshiki Natasha"
 Closing performances 
 "First Rabbit"
 "Iiwake Maybe"
 "Melon Juice"
 "Seishun no Laptime"
 "Kataomoi Finally"
 "Ponytail to Shushu"
 Halloween Finale
 "Halloween Night"

Extras
 Encore
 "LOVE TRIP" 
 "365 Nichi no Kamihikouki"  
 Grand Finale: "To Be Continued"  
 Sayaka Yamamoto's birthday surprise & Miyuki Watanabe final message
 BONUS FOOTAGE: Making of from AKB48 Fes

References

External links
 Complete setlist for AKB48 Fes 2016
 Main Article: AKB48 Show!

AKB48
2016 television specials
Japanese television specials